"L'Accordéoniste" is a song made famous by Édith Piaf. It was written in 1940 by Michel Emer, who then offered it to her.

Commercial performance 
"L'Accordéoniste" became the first million-seller in Piaf's career.

Composition 
The song tells a story of a prostitute who loves an accordion player (and the music he plays, namely a dance called java). Then he has to leave for the war. She finds refuge in music, dreaming about how they will live together when he comes back.

Track listings 
10" shellac single Polydor 524 669 (France, 1940)
 "Escales"
 "L'Accordéoniste"

References 

 

1940 songs
French songs
Édith Piaf songs
Songs about prostitutes
Songs about musicians